The blackspotted nothobranch (Nothobranchius melanospilus) is a species of fish in the family Nothobranchiidae. It is found in Kenya and Tanzania. Its natural habitats are  temporary pools and floodplains, rice fields, swamps, ditches, and small streams. It grows to  total length.

References

Nothobranchius
Freshwater fish of Kenya
Freshwater fish of Tanzania
Fish described in 1896
Taxa named by Georg Johann Pfeffer
Taxonomy articles created by Polbot